Jamsetji Merwanji (also spelled Jamsetjee; born 1871/2) was an Indian professional racquets player, who was world champion of the sport from 1903 to 1911.

Profile
He was a Parsi who worked as a "marker" (club professional) at the Bombay Gymkhana. In 1903 in England, he played Gilbert Browne at  Queen's Club and Prince's Club for the vacant world title, winning by five games to one. The world title was contested by challenge, and the distance between India and Britain or America meant he never had to defend his title until 1911. His closest rival in India was his brother Padanji, who was a marker in Pune.  He was finally challenged in late 1909, for 5,000 rupees, by Charles Williams, who had beaten amateur E. M. Baerlein to become English champion. The contest did not take place until 1911, when several Indian sports teams journeyed to Britain around the  coronation of George V and 1911 Imperial Conference. Jumanji easily beat Baerlein in a warm-up match, but Williams, 17 years Jumanji's junior, beat him at Queen's Club by five games to nil.

Footnotes

References

Racquets players
Parsi people from Mumbai
Racket sportspeople from Mumbai
1870s births
20th-century deaths
World rackets champion
Year of death missing